Artelida crinipes is the species of the Lepturinae subfamily in long-horned beetle family. This beetle is distributed on island of Madagascar.

References

Lepturinae